Gordon Smith Guitars is a manufacturer of hand-crafted electric guitars. They are the UK's longest-established electric guitar manufacturer and have been called the English equivalent to Gibson on that basis.

History 
The company was founded in 1974 and is named after its founders, Gordon Whitham and John Smith. In April 2015 Gordon Smith Guitars was acquired by British-based Auden Guitars and production moved from Partington near Manchester, England to Audens Guitars' workshop in Higham Ferrers, Northamptonshire.

The company aims to produce quality guitars for working musicians and say that they make "guitars, not furniture".

Gordon Smith Guitars are among the highest-rated manufacturers for use of sustainable woods in guitar construction, according to the Ethical Consumer.

Range 

The Gordon Smith range includes original designs, such as the Galaxy, as well as S-style, T-style and LP-style models. All models currently use a brass nut.

The company offers many options for customising guitars, including a choice of hardware and finishes, single- or double-cutaway and left- or right-handed guitars. Twelve-string and double-necked versions of the range are also available.

Gordon Smith produce their own pickups in-house.

Their humbucker pickups are coil-tapped as standard to give players access to a broader palette of sounds.

Awards
Guitarist magazine reviewed the Gordon Smith GS1000 and gave it their Gold award.

Players
The company does not offer celebrity endorsements. Guitarists known to have used Gordon Smith guitars include:

 Mick Abrahams of Jethro Tull and Blodwyn Pig
 Aaron Barrett of Reel Big Fish and The Forces of Evil
 Ian Miles of Creeper
 Rhys Jenkins of The Arteries and Hot Mass
 Billy Bragg
 Nicky Garratt of U.K. Subs
 Dee Dee Ramone of Ramones
 Kloot Per W of Polyphonic Size and De Lama's
 Pete Shelley of The Buzzcocks
 John Squire of The Stone Roses
 Midge Ure of Thin Lizzy and Ultravox
 James McCreedy of Motion Pictures/Dark Tower/The Biggest Thrill 
 Dan Goatham of Spoilers 
 Members of The Futureheads
 Nicke Andersson of The Hellacopters
 Larry Hibbitt of Hundred Reasons
 Adam Pearson and Mike Varjak of The Sisters Of Mercy
 Frankie Stubbs and Dickie Hammond of Leatherface
 Members of Snuff
 James Dean Bradfield of Manic Street Preachers
 Dave Wolfenden of Red Lorry Yellow Lorry
 Paul Kostabi of Psychotica
 Bill McQueen of China Drum
 William McGonagle of Hell Is For Heroes
 JW of Hookworms
 John Otway
 Phillip Foxley
 Richard Tyler formerly of Rosalita 
 Ben Wood & Andy Duke of Ben Wood & The Bad Ideas
 Allan Holdsworth

References

External links
 
 Review of Gordon-Smith Gypsy II

Guitar manufacturing companies
Musical instrument manufacturing companies of the United Kingdom
Companies based in Trafford